Ağbulaq or Aghbulag  or Agbulak or Agbulakh or Agbulag or Aghboulagh or Aghbulagh may refer to:

In Armenia:
Aghberk, a village in the Gegharkunik Province
Aghbullagh, an abandoned village in the Goris Municipality, Syunik Province
Lusaghbyur, Lori, a town in the Lori Province

In Azerbaijan:
Ağbulaq, Ismailli, a village and municipality in the Ismailli Rayon
Ağbulaq, Jalilabad, a village in the Jalilabad Rayon
Ağbulaq, Kalbajar, a village in the Kalbajar Rayon
Ağbulaq, Khojali, a village in the Khojali Rayon
Ağbulaq, Khojavend, a village in the Khojavend Rayon, and in the Hadrut Province of the Republic of Artsakh
Ağbulaq (Mysmana), Khojavend, a village in the Khojavend Rayon, and in the Martuni Province of the Republic of Artsakh
Ağbulaq, Lachin, a Kurdish village in the Lachin Rayon
Ağbulaq, Nakhchivan, a village and municipality in the Shahbuz Rayon of Nakhchivan
Ağbulaq, Shusha, a village in the Shusha Rayon
Ağbulaq, Tovuz, a village and municipality in the Tovuz Rayon

See also
Akbulak (disambiguation)
Ak-Bulak (disambiguation)
Aq Bolagh (disambiguation)
Aq Bulaq (disambiguation)